Kryštof is a Czech name, equivalent to English Christopher. It may refer to:

Jakub Kryštof Rad (1799–1871), Swiss-born Czech entrepreneur who invented the sugar cubes in 1841 as director of a sugar factory in Dačice, Moravia
Kryštof Harant (1564–1621), Czech nobleman, traveller, humanist, soldier, writer and composer
Kryštof Krýzl (born 1986), Czech alpine skier

See also
Kryštof (band), Czech music popular music band
Krzysztof